Eyebrow is a village in the Canadian province of Saskatchewan within the Rural Municipality of Eyebrow No. 193 and Census Division No. 7. The community originated at the location that is now the abandoned community of Eskbank several kilometres to the south. Eyebrow is located at the intersection of Highway 367 and Highway 42; 84 km northwest of Moose Jaw, 154 km northwest of Regina and 196 km south of Saskatoon.

History 
A post office was established in 1904 called Eyebrow Hill located just south in Sec.12, Twp.20, R.2, W3 of the Dominion Land Survey. Eyebrow Hill was renamed Eskbank in 1908. The post office of Eyebrow Station (Sec.24, Twp.21, R.2, W3)  was established in 1908 then was renamed Eyebrow six months later. Eyebrow incorporated as a village on January 8, 1909.

Geography 
The Eyebrow Hills and Eye Lake are located north of the village (not to be confused with Eyebrow Lake located in the Qu'Appelle Valley near the village of Tugaske).

Demographics 

Activities 

The ERHL or Eyebrow Recreation Hockey League is a local outdoor hockey league consisting of three teams: the Blazers, Puck Hogs and Eskimos.
Former  NHL Player Mark Smith was raised near Eyebrow.

See also 

 List of communities in Saskatchewan
 Villages of Saskatchewan

References

Eyebrow No. 193, Saskatchewan
Villages in Saskatchewan
Division No. 7, Saskatchewan